Pudu is a census town in Dakshina Kannada district in the Indian state of Karnataka.

Demographics
 Indian census, Pudu had a population of 12,409. Males and females each constitute 50% of the population. Pudu has an average literacy rate of 69%, higher than the national average of 59.5%: male literacy is 76%, and female literacy is 61%. In Pudu, 15% of the population is under 6 years of age.

References

Cities and towns in Dakshina Kannada district

nl:Zuidelijke poedoe